Enitan Adepitan (born 9 December 1994), known professionally as Enny (stylized in all caps), is an English rapper, singer and songwriter. She is best known for her 2020 single "Peng Black Girls" which gained popularity following a remix version with Jorja Smith which was performed live on ColorsxStudios.

Early life 
Coming from Nigerian heritage, Enny was born and raised in Thamesmead, South East London. She lives with her parents and was one of six siblings. During her early childhood, Enny’s interest in music started from young. This led to her experimenting with music influenced by her family and was taught to play instruments from her father such as the keyboard. Enny would also participate in a local street dance group where they would play and dance to American hip-hop. Through the influence of music genres such as jazz, gospel music and hip-hop, these music tastes she would inherit from her friend and family would have a later musical impact on her career. After high school she attempted the film industry for two years. However, after being unsuccessful and unsatisfied with her career path, she continued to focus on music and freestyling.

Career 
Enny began her music career by releasing freestyle videos on YouTube. These videos lead to her self-released debut single, "He's Not Into You", in April 2020, which features life lessons on dream relationships. With this hit single, Enny was recognized and introduced to the studio program, Root 73, by her certain manager, Pascal. She would later be scouted by English singer-songwriter Jorja Smith who signed her to her own label FAMM. This is what sparked her career to have more popular song releases such as "Peng Black Girls" which was produced in 2021. Being the most popular with fans, the song's initial release had over a million views. With the collaboration with Jorja Smith, the song's remix gained over 5 million more views. Enny is becoming a part of the golden age of UK rappers and continues to create music.

Discography

Extended plays
 Under Twenty Five (2021)

Singles

Promotional singles

Awards and nominations

References

External links 
 Official website
 MusicBrainz
 SoundCloud

Living people
1994 births
Black British women rappers
21st-century Black British women singers
British hip hop singers
English people of Nigerian descent
People from Thamesmead
21st-century women rappers
Women songwriters
English songwriters